St. Martins is a community on the Bay of Fundy in Saint John County, New Brunswick, Canada.

The village was founded as Quaco by 1783 by soldiers from the disbanded loyalist King's Orange Rangers. It was incorporated in 1967. Led by shipbuilders such as James Moran, it was the third most productive shipbuilding town in the Maritimes, producing over 500 ships. Shipbuilding declined after the 1870s and today tourism is the major industry.

On 1 January 2023, St. Martins annexed all or part of three local service districts to form the new village of Fundy-St. Martins. The community's name remains in official use.

Attractions
Attractions in St. Martins include the St. Martins Sea Caves, the beach and tidal harbour, the start of the Fundy Trail, two covered bridges and the Quaco Head Lighthouse, the Quaco Museum and Library, and the Fundy Trail Parkway.

Demographics

Gallery

Further reading
 Hebb, Ross M., Quaco - St. Martins: A Brief History, 1997. Fredericton, NB: Quaco/Springhill Press.

See also
List of lighthouses in New Brunswick
List of communities in New Brunswick
 History of New Brunswick
 List of historic places in Saint John County, New Brunswick

References

External links

Communities in Saint John County, New Brunswick
Former villages in New Brunswick
Lighthouses in New Brunswick